The Czech Republic men's national tennis team represents the Czech Republic in the Davis Cup and is governed by the Czech Tennis Federation. The Czech team was started in 1993, following the break-up of Czechoslovakia.

The team competed in the Europe/Africa Zone I in 2019. It has played in the World Group in all but one year since it was created in 1981, sharing this record with the United States.

Current team (2022)

 Jiří Lehečka
 Tomáš Macháč
 Zdeněk Kolář
 Dalibor Svrčina

History

The Czech Republic competed in its first Davis Cup in 1921, as Czechoslovakia.

From 1930 to 1939 Ladislav Hecht played for the Czech Republic Davis Cup team, achieving a record of 18-19, and was its Captain.  Hecht was invited to play for the German Davis Cup Team in 1938, by an aide to Adolph Hitler who was unaware that he was Jewish, but declined. 

The Czech Republic won the Davis Cup in 1980 as Czechoslovakia, and in 2012 and 2013 as the Czech Republic in Prague and Belgrade respectively.

Recent performances
Here is the list of all match-ups since 1981, when the competition started being held in the current World Group format.

1980s

1990s

2000s

2010s

References

External links

Davis Cup teams
Davis Cup
Davis Cup